Elijah Gregory Seymour (born 5 November 1998) is a Caymanian footballer who plays as a midfielder.

Career
At the age of 15, Seymour trialed for the youth academy of English fifth division side Barnet. In 2016, he signed for Cockfosters in the English ninth division. In 2017, he signed for English seventh division club Wingate & Finchley. In 2018, Seymour signed for União da Madeira in Portugal. In 2019, he signed for Romanian third division team Voluntari II, where he said, "Romanian football is very different from the one we used to play in Portugal. In Portugal it was more of a technical skill. Here, where I play, in League 3 for now, there is more intensity and the very important physical factor. There is less emphasis on technical capacity." In 2021, Seymour signed for Dunărea Călărași in the Romanian second division.

Honours
CSM Slatina
Liga III: 2021–22

References

External links

 Elijah Seymour at playmakerstats.com
 

Caymanian footballers
Association football midfielders
Living people
C.F. União players
FC Dunărea Călărași players
CSM Slatina footballers
Liga II players
Liga III players
Campeonato de Portugal (league) players
1998 births
Caymanian expatriate footballers
Expatriate footballers in England
Expatriate footballers in Portugal
Expatriate footballers in Romania
Caymanian expatriate sportspeople in England
Caymanian expatriate sportspeople in Portugal
Caymanian expatriate sportspeople in Romania
Cayman Islands international footballers